The Mob Piru (also known as MOB Piru or Mob Piru Bloods) are a "set" of the Piru gang alliance, which is itself part of the larger Bloods alliance. This Piru set is notable for its connection with Suge Knight, the co-founder and former CEO of Death Row Records.

History

Founding of the Bloods 
In 1969, Sylvester Scott and Vincent Owens, who lived on Piru Street, Compton, formed a street gang called the Piru Street Boys. The gang was originally allies with the Crips, but after falling out in 1972, the Pirus, along with several other gangs, including the Brims, Bounty Hunters and Denver Lanes formed an alliance to defend themselves against the Crips. The Pirus have been described as a "precursor" to the Bloods. There are at least 15 Piru "sets" (sub-groups) in the greater Los Angeles area.

Death Row Records 

Suge Knight, who would co-found Death Row Records, became affiliated with the Mob Piru set at some point and would hire many Mob Piru members in Death Row Records. When Tupac Shakur joined Death Row Records in 1995, he also became affiliated with the Mob Piru. Other notable Mob Pirus who were associated with Death Row Records include: 

 Wardell "Poochie" Fouse, who was implicated in the murder of The Notorious B.I.G. Fouse was shot dead on 24 July 2003. 
 Trevon "Tray" Lane, who was attacked at Lakewood Shopping Mall by a group of Crips, including Orlando Anderson. Several weeks later, on 7 September 1996, Trevon, and several Death Row members including Suge and Tupac beat Anderson at the MGM Grand. Several hours after this beating, Tupac is shot by an unknown gunman and dies 6 days later.
 Alton “Buntry” McDonald, who was close friends with Suge Knight. McDonald was shot dead on 3 April 2022. 
 Henry “Hendog” Smith, who designed the logo for Death Row Records. Smith was shot dead on 16 October 2002.

Criminal activities 
The Mob Piru engage in drug trafficking, credit card scams, arms dealing and robbery. Suge Knight is alleged to have provided the Mob Piru with large quantities of assault rifles.

References 

Criminal organizations
Bloods
Gangs in the United States
Gangs in Los Angeles
Bloods sets